Power in the Blood is the third album by Alabama 3.

Track listing
All tracks composed by Alabama 3; except where indicated

 "Two Heads" - 1:07
 "Power in the Blood" - 4:46
 "Reachin'" - 4:09
 "Woody Guthrie" - 4:17
 "Year Zero" - 4:23
 "The Devil Went Down to Ibiza" - 2:51
 "Strobe Life" - 6:12
 "R.E.H.A.B." - 3:52
 "The Moon has Lost the Sun" - 3:47
 "Let the Caged Bird Sing"- 2:34
 "Yellow Rose" - 4:55
 "Bullet Proof" - 3:55
 "Badlands"  (Bruce Springsteen) - 0:47
 "Lord Have Mercy" - 6:13
 "Come on Home"- 1:20

Bonus disc
The first 10,000 pressings of Power in the Blood include a bonus disc of six acoustic tracks, known as Acoustic Power.

 "Woke Up This Morning" - 4:05
 "Power in the Blood" - 2:31
 "Disneyland Is Burning" - 3:00
 "U Don't Danse 2 Tekno Anymore" - 3:46
 "Year Zero" - 4:15
 "Mansion on the Hill" - 3:06

Personnel
Alabama 3
Larry Love (Rob Spragg) - vocals
The Very Rev. D.Wayne Love (Jake Black) - vocals
Rock Freebase (Mark Sams) - guitars
The Mountain of Love (Piers Marsh) - harp, programmes, vocals
L.B. Dope (Johnny Delafons) - drums, programming
Sir "Eddie" Real (Simon Edwards) - percussion
The Spirit (Orlando Harrison) - keyboards
Frank Zappatista (John "Segs" Jennings) - bass, vocals
with:
Val Harrison - vocals on "Reachin'"
Nick Tosches - vocals on "R.E.H.A.B."
Hubert Selby, Jr. - vocals on "The Moon has Lost the Sun"
Lisa Delatour Billson - vocals on "Year Zero", backing vocals on "Power in the Blood"
Val Harrison - vocals on "Reachin'"
Be Atwell and Siobhan Parr - vocals on "Bullet Proof"
Michael Groce - vocals on "Lord Have Mercy"

"In Memorium: Sinead Niamh Clarke (1976-2000), Lousie Jane Bedford (1971-2002) and Madge McCandless (1930-2002)"

Cover Version
"Power in the Blood" was later recorded by Canadian singer Buffy Sainte-Marie as the title track of her 2015 album. The album won the 2015 Polaris Music Prize on September 21, 2015.

References

2003 albums
Alabama 3 albums
Geffen Records albums
One Little Independent Records albums